Hanpu Subdistrict is a subdistrict of Yuelu District in Changsha, Hunan, China. It is historically the territory of Jiujiang Township, Wangcheng County in 1994. The subdistrict has four villages and a community under its jurisdiction. its seat is Hantai Community.

History
In 589 AD, Linxiang County was renamed to Changsha County, today's Hanpu Subdistrict was part of Changsha County. From the year 1098 AD, Shanhua County was established from Changsha County, by 1912, Shanhua was incorporated into Changsha County, it belonged to Shanhua County. Hanpu was the former Fulong Town of Changsha County in 1912 and it was part of the 10th District of Changsha County in 1930.

Through the Revocation of Districts and Amalgamation of Townships in 1938, it was relocated to the place as the townships of Hanpu and Cahngle. In March 1950, the township of Jiujiang was reformed in the 13th District of Changsha County. In May 1951, Wangcheng County was established from part of Changsha County and Jiujiang Township belonged to the 4th District of Wangcheng County. In May 1953, the size of the townships were reduced, the subdistrict of Jiujiang was historically the territories of townships of Jiujiang, Yunpan, Fengtian, Jianzi and Dapo in the 8th District (Pingguan District) of Wangcheng County. As the Revocation of Districts and Amalgamation of Townships in June 1956, the former Pingguan District was divided into four townships as Jiujiang Township.

As the Revocation of Townships and Establishment of Communes in October 1958, Jiujiang Township was merged into the Pingtang People's Commune, Wangcheng County was formally merged to Changsha County in March 1959 and Pingtang was a district of Changsha County. As administrative divisions of a county, county controlled districts were reorganized in July 1961 and the Pingtang District of Changsha County was established, meanwhile the size of the communes was reduced and Jiujiang Commune was formed from Pingtang Commune. In December 1962, Lianhua District was created from part of Pingtang District, the Jiujiang Commune still belonged to Pingtang District. In January 1978, Wangcheng County was rebuilt and Jiujiang was in the territory of Wangcheng County.

In March 1984, the commune of Jiujiang  was reorganized to a township, the township of Jiujiang governed 13 villages of Jiujiang, Jianzi, Yunpan, Zhizi, Dongtinggou, Guanbukou, Hanpu, Dapo, Liqiao, Lishushan, Qujiang, Fengtian and Huatang.

As the Revocation of Districts and Amalgamation of Townships in June 1995, the township of Xueshi was merged into Jiujiang Township, the township of Jiujiang had 23 villages with a total area of 91.8 square kilometers, its seat was in Liqiao Village.

In February 1998, the township of Jiujiang was reorganized into the town of Hanpu. Hanpu Town governed a community and 23 villages with a total area of 91.8 square kilometers. As the Amalgamation of Village-level Divisions of Wangcheng County in 2004, the divisions of Hanpu was reduced to 12 (2 communities and 10 villages) from 24 (a community and 23 villages).

On June 15, 2008, the town of Hanpu was transferred from Wangcheng County to Yuelu District. On August 3, 2012, the town of Hanpu was officially reorganized to a subdistrict. On January 18, 2013, the former Hanpu Subdistrict was converted to the two subdistricts of Hanpu and Xueshi. The newly established Hanpu Subdistrict had a community (Hanpu Community), six villages of Guanbukou, Xintian, Jiujiang, Dapo, Zhizigang and Ganzi with an area of 49.6 square kilometers, Hanpu Community was its seat. As a new round of the Amalgamation of Village-level Divisions in 2016, the former Hanpu community and the Guanbukou Village were merged to form Hantai Community, the two villages of Xintian and Jiujiang were merged to form Jiufeng Village, its divisions were reduced to five from seven, it has a community and four villages under its jurisdiction, its seat is Hantai Community.

Subdivisions
On January 18, 2013, the former Hanpu Subdistrict was divided into the two subdistricts of Hanpu and Xueshi. The newly established Hanpu Subdistrict had a community and six villages with an area of 49.6 square kilometers. As a new round of the Amalgamation of Village-level Divisions in 2016, the  divisions of Hanpu Subdistrict were reduced to five from seven, it has a community and four villages under its jurisdiction.

4 villages
 Dapo Village
 Ganzi Village also called Jianzi Village
 Jiufeng Village
 Zhizigang Village

a community
 Hantai community

References

External links
 Official Website （Chinese / 中文）

Yuelu District
Subdistricts of Changsha